Sadanga, officially the Municipality of Sadanga  is a 5th class municipality in the province of Mountain Province, Philippines. According to the 2020 census, it has a population of 8,427 people.
Sadanga boundaries both provinces are Abra to the northwest & west and Kalinga to the north & 
northeast.

The municipality is the only place in the world where the Sinadanga language is used. The language is highly significant in the Sinadanga culture, making its conservation an utmost importance to the survival of the Sinadanga people's traditions.

History

Chico River Dam Project 
Sadanga was one of several municipalities in Mountain Province which would have been flooded by the Chico River Dam Project during the Marcos dictatorship, alongside Bauko, Bontoc, Sabangan, Sagada, and parts of Barlig.  However, the indigenous peoples of Kalinga Province and Mountain Province resisted the project and when hostilities resulted in the murder of Macli-ing Dulag, the project became unpopular and was abandoned before Marcos was ousted by the 1986 People Power Revolution.

Geography

Barangays
Sadanga is politically subdivided into 8 barangays. These barangays are headed by elected officials: Barangay Captain, Barangay Council, whose members are called Barangay Councilors. All are elected every three years.
 Anabel
 Belwang
 Betwagan
 Bekigan
 Poblacion
 Sacasacan
 Saclit
 Demang

Climate

Demographics

Economy

Government
Sadanga, belonging to the lone congressional district of the province of Mountain Province, is governed by a mayor designated as its local chief executive and by a municipal council as its legislative body in accordance with the Local Government Code. The mayor, vice mayor, and the councilors are elected directly by the people through an election which is being held every three years.

Elected officials

Members of the Municipal Council (2019–2022):
 Congressman: Maximo Y. Dalog Jr.
 Mayor: Gabino P. Ganggangan
 Vice-Mayor: Albert T. Ayao-ao
 Councilors:
 Daniel G. Dawadeo
 Juliet K. Chinalpan
 Napoleon P. Sarang-ey
 Dominga P. Chaluyen
 Rufino C. Chakiwag
 Ruben P. Atiwen
 Moises F. Agmeyeng
 Dimas A. Feng-ag

Culture
The town has its indigenous council of elders who make decisions for the indigenous Isadanga people. The Isadanga have their own language, called the Sinadanga, which is preserved by the people themselves by using it in homes, schools, and everyday life more than the national language. The Sinadanga language is one of the hardest languages to learn from the Cordilleras. The people also have their own back-strap loom weaving culture, epic chants for planting and harvesting rice, rice terracing practices, indigenous rituals to the gods such as the pumatay (ritual where pawid stalks are burnt while cooking meat, then the food is served to the gods), and vernacular house architecture.

The most prominent tradition of the Isadanga people is the enforcement of the teer (day of rest) and closure of the village from visitors. The tradition begins with a meeting of the council of elders within the center of the town. The council negotiates with its members on whether they should close the village or not and when. Once a truce has been made, the elders will drink their traditional wine and one of the elders will announce the decision via public statement, which can be heard throughout the village valley. The tradition is made so that for a period of time, the Isadanga townsfolk can rest from their traditional work, and can manage to converse and strengthen their bonds with each other through public engagement with their neighbors.

The next step after the announcement is made is to establish the fayavey (long tree stalks) at both sides of the road entrance of the town. The establishment of the fayavey directly puts the town closure in effect, and thus, negates all visitors from visiting the town. The council of elders input a guard at the town's entrance and the fayavey to protect the town from unwanted visitors. The fayavey is also the main symbol of the Isadanga's teer. On the imposition of the fayavey, the people are usually seen within the ator or place of public engagement. The fayavey is disestablished on a certain day and time as agreed upon by the council of elders.

Environment
The environment of Sadanga is serene and clear from garbage as cleanliness for the environment is a norm in Sadanga culture. Sadanga is home to the Fowa-As falls, a sacred water source. Littering and any other form of destruction within the site, and the entire valley in general, is strictly prohibited.

Sister cities
 Quezon City, since October 2004

References

External links

 [ Philippine Standard Geographic Code]
Philippine Census Information

Municipalities of Mountain Province
Populated places on the Rio Chico de Cagayan